Farende  is a village in the Bimah Prefecture in the Kara Region  of north-eastern Togo. Charles Piot, of Duke University, has written books on Farende and its neighboring villages.

References

Populated places in Kara Region
Bimah Prefecture